Tim Heinemann (born 23 October 1997) is a German driver. He won the inaugural DTM Trophy in 2020, driving for HP Racing International, followed by a second title in 2022. He has also raced in the VLN, Nürburgring 24 Hours, ADAC GT4 Germany, ADAC GT Masters, GTC Race and the BMW M2 Cup. He also competed in multiple Sim racing events.

Racing Record

Career summary

†Guest driver ineligible to score points

References

External links
 Official website
 

1997 births
Living people
Sportspeople from Essen
German racing drivers
Racing drivers from North Rhine-Westphalia
Nürburgring 24 Hours drivers
ADAC GT Masters drivers
Toyota Gazoo Racing drivers
Deutsche Tourenwagen Masters drivers
Toksport WRT drivers